Sekyere South District is one of the forty-three districts in Ashanti Region, Ghana. Originally created as an ordinary district assembly in 1988 when it was known as Afigya-Sekyere District, which it was created from part of the former Kwabre-Sekyere District Council; until the western part of the district (the Afigya portion) was split off to become the northern portion of Afigya-Kwabre District on 1 November 2007 (effectively 29 February 2008); while the remaining portion has since then been officially renamed as Sekyere South District. The district assembly is located in the eastern part of Ashanti Region and has Agona as its capital town.

Geography
Sekyere South District is nearly all tropical forest. The district contains many types of lumber wood. There are usually around 120 days of rain per year, but most of these occur during the "rainy season", between March and July.

Economy
Two thirds of the district's workforce are farmers, with most of the rest employed in the service sector. Major food crops include cassava, plantain, yam, and maize. The biggest cash crops are cocoa, citrus fruits, coffee, and palm oil. Many people practice kente weaving and local forms of pottery, which are then exported.

Education
There are 329 schools in the district. SDA midwifery training college and Withrow university college both in Asamang, SDA college of Education in Agona are the few notable  tertiary institutions in the district.

Health
There are 18 health centers in the district.

Tourism
Many of the Ashanti region's most popular tourist attractions, such as Trobo Waterfall and the Aboye Festival, are in the Sekyere South district.

References

Sources
 Sekyere South Districts

Districts of Ashanti Region